Richard Palmer may refer to:

Richard Palmer (bishop) (died 1191), archbishop of Messina
Richard Palmer (priest) (–1805), English priest, Chaplain to the Speaker of the House of Commons
Richard Palmer (entrepreneur), founder of the company d3o Lab
Richard F. Palmer (1930–2018), American newspaper editor and politician
Richard G. Palmer (born 1949), British physicist
Richard H. Palmer (1876–1931), tennis player
Richard N. Palmer (born 1950), Associate Justice of the Connecticut Supreme Court
Richard Palmer-James (born 1947), lyricist for King Crimson and Supertramp
A. Richard Palmer, biologist
Richard Palmer (cricketer) (1848–1939), English cricketer

See also
 Dick Palmer (disambiguation)
Ricardus le Palmere, English MP